Monophyllanthe is a genus of plants native to Brazil, Colombia, French Guinea and Suriname. It contains 2 recognized species:
Monophyllanthe araracuarensis S.Suárez, Galeano & H.Kenn. - Brazil and Colombia
Monophyllanthe oligophylla K.Schum. - French Guiana and Suriname

References

Marantaceae
Zingiberales genera